Ra is a 2014 Indian Tamil fantasy horror-film  written by Ashraf and Prabu Yuvaraj and directed by debutant Prabu Yuvaraj. The movie features Ashraf and Aditi Chengappa in lead roles. Produced by Ameen and Akbar and featuring music by Raj Aryan, it has cinematography by Saravanan Ramasamy.  The film was launched at Chennai in July 2013. The movie seems to have been highly inspired by the Hollywood movie Insidious.

Plot
Renya, Ajay's wife, had died mysteriously on the very first day of their marriage. Ajay started a quest to solve the mystery behind his wife's death. Then, he went to a ghost hunter to ask a favor, to help him see his wife's soul . The ghost hunter hypnotised him and sent him to another world as he traveled he tried to go through mysterious red door. After that he came to reality he explained what he had done in alternate world. The ghost hunter, after hearing him said that the red door was protected by a deadly monster, if anybody entered the red door, a big war would rise into action in the world,  soon the world would be destroyed by the monster. A few days later some panoramal activities are observed at Ajay's house. Then movie ends with some twist and horror scene.

Cast
 Ashraf as Ajay
 Aditi Chengappa as Renya
 JP Jay as Inspector Deena Dayalan
 Lawrence R as Prabu
 Geetha Baby

Release
The film was released on 5 December 2014.

Critical reception
The film received mostly positive reviews from critics. Behindwoods rated the film positively and wrote, "A fairly well made thriller by debutants with strong technical backing". M. Suganth of The Times Of India gave 3.5 out of 5 and wrote, "Ra is essentially a haunted house thriller but the writers Ashraf and Prabu Yuvaraj (the hero and the director of the film respectively) introduce an element of fantasy that gives it a different color. And, their treatment isn't kitschy in the least bit and the director whips up a genuine sense of dread like Hollywood horror films Insidious, Stir Of Echoes and Dead Silence".

References

External links
 

2014 fantasy films
Indian fantasy films
2014 films
2010s Tamil-language films
2014 directorial debut films